Louis Doutreleau, SJ (1909-2005) was a French Jesuit priest closely associated over a long period with the publishing enterprise of the Sources Chrétiennes Institute in Lyons. He edited volumes of the works of Irenaeus, Origen, Didymus the Blind and of John Chrysostom. Together with Georges-Mathieu de Durand he also edited Basil of Caesarea, Against Eunomius.

Works 
Mosäiques:Anthologie de Sources Chrétiennes, 2vol., Paris 1993.

1909 births
2005 deaths
20th-century French Jesuits
21st-century French Jesuits